All Men Are Mortal is a 1995 film directed by Ate de Jong and starring Irène Jacob, Stephen Rea, and Marianne Sägebrecht. It is based on the novel All Men Are Mortal (1946) by Simone de Beauvoir.

Cast
 Irène Jacob as Regina
 Stephen Rea as Fosca
 Marianne Sägebrecht as Annie
 Colin Salmon as Chas
 Maggie O'Neill as Florence
 John Nettles as Sanier
 Steve Nicolson as Laforet
 Jango Edwards as Adelson
 Derek de Lint as Bertus
 Chiara Mastroianni as Françoise
 David Healy as Movie Producer
 Michael Gaunt as The Mayor of Rouen
 George Raistrick as Police Chief
 Jane Wymark as Gertrude, The Actress 
 Terence McGinity as Claudius, The Actor 
 Flóra Kádár as Old Woman

References

External links
 

1995 films
Films based on French novels
1995 drama films
English-language French films
English-language Dutch films
Simone de Beauvoir
1990s English-language films
Films directed by Ate de Jong